The Committee on Monetary and Economic Reform (COMER) is an economics-oriented publishing and education centre based in Toronto, Ontario, Canada.

Organization 
COMER was co-founded by William Krehm and John Hotson in the 1980s as a think tank out of concern for the "debt-based monetary system" described as unsustainable. COMER says it studies the destabilization that current economic and monetary policies have caused, and are causing, for the citizens of Canada and other countries. COMER argues for a mixed economy, and changes in monetary policy through what it argues is the mandate under the Bank of Canada Act. Ann Emmett is the chair of the organization.

Lawsuit against Bank of Canada
In 2011, COMER brought a lawsuit against the Canadian Government. COMER claimed that the Bank of Canada is mandated under the Bank of Canada Act to provide debt-free support for public projects undertaken by federal, provincial and city governments, as it did from its foundation in 1935 to 1974. In order for them to join the Bank for International Settlements (BIS), Canada has had to stop this policy. COMER argues that this move meant that Canada had unconstitutionally given up control over its ability to set its independent monetary policy to "secret" deliberations and control of the private foreign bankers at the BIS. The organization is represented by Rocco Galati.

On August 9, 2013, COMER's claim was struck without leave to amend by Prothonotary Kevin R. Aalto.  No costs were awarded.

In 2014, on appeal, Judge Russell of the Federal court ruled that the claim should be struck in its entirety. He did grant leave to amend the claim. This ruling was appealed to the Federal Court of Appeal by COMER over the ruling itself and cross appealed by the Crown over the granting of leave to amend the claim.

On January 26, 2015, the Federal Court of Appeal heard the appeals, and dismissed the appeal and cross-appeal without costs. COMER was given 60 days to file an amended statement of claim.

COMER filed an amended statement of claim on March 26, 2015.  On April 24 the Crown filed for an order striking the claim and dismissing the action. Arguments for and against the Crown motion were heard by Justice Russell on October 14, 2015.  On February 8 in his ruling Justice Russell struck COMER's amended claim in its entirety and refused leave to amend the claim.  Costs were awarded to the Crown. In his ruling, Justice Russell stated "their response convinces me that, for reasons given, they have no scintilla of a cause of action that this Court can or should hear."

On March 3, 2016, COMER filed a notice of appeal with the Court of Appeal.

On December 7, 2016, the Federal Court of appeal heard this latest appeal, and dismissed it with costs.

On February 1, 2017 COMER filed an application for leave to appeal with the Supreme Court of Canada.

On May 4, 2017 the Supreme Court dismissed COMER's application for leave to appeal.

See also
American Monetary Institute
Chicago plan
The Chicago Plan Revisited
A Program for Monetary Reform

References

External links
 COMER website

Political advocacy groups in Canada
Monetary reformers
Monetary reform